The John Arnold House, located off Kentucky Route 1295 in Garrard County, Kentucky, near Paint Lick, was listed on the National Register of Historic Places in 1983.

It is a one-and-a-half-story three-bay central passage plan dry stone house built in the early 1800s.  It has a rare three-room arrangement (one of only two known in Kentucky).

References

Houses on the National Register of Historic Places in Kentucky
Federal architecture in Kentucky
Houses in Garrard County, Kentucky
Houses completed in the 19th century
Central-passage houses
National Register of Historic Places in Garrard County, Kentucky